The Department of Finance and Economy of Principality of Monaco is a governmental agency in Monaco in charge of public finances of the state. The department is led by Government Consellor for Finance and Economy.

Counsellors

See also 
Council of Government
Economy of Monaco

References

Politics of Monaco
Political organisations based in Monaco
Monaco
Government of Monaco